Ernest Robert Suter (10 July 1880 – 1945) was an English footballer who played in the Football League for Halifax Town and Notts County. Suter had a twenty-year association with Halifax Town where he had roles as player, trainer, coach, groundsman and general handyman.

References

1880 births
1945 deaths
English footballers
Association football goalkeepers
English Football League players
Notts County F.C. players
Newark F.C. players
Goole Town F.C. players
Halifax Town A.F.C. players